WebDNA is a server-side scripting, interpreted language with an embedded database system, specifically designed for the World Wide Web.  Its primary use is in creating database-driven dynamic web page applications. Released in 1995, the name was registered as a trademark in 1998. WebDNA is currently maintained by WebDNA Software Corporation.

Notable features 
WebDNA contains a RAM-resident database system (Hybrid In-memory database) that has searching and editing capabilities. A resilient and persistent backup of the RAM databases is maintained to disk. WebDNA code can interweave with css, html/html5 and js/ajax, allowing to mix layout with programming and server-side with client-side scripting. Some instructions allow to interact with remote servers. It is usually considered as an easy-to-learn scripting language and has been designed for webmasters, webdesigners and programmers looking for quick results.

WebDNA is made up of a syntax that uses square brackets ("[" "]") and the English language. For example, to display today's date on a web page, simply insert "[date]" within the HTML or CSS code where you want the live date to appear; likewise with "[time]". To show some text only to a specific client IP address request, the 'showif' context can be used: [showif [ipaddress]=xxx.xxx.xxx.xxx]Some Text[/showif]. Most WebDNA tags, contexts and commands follow similar conventions.

Terminology 
The WebDNA syntax is based on a simple format:

 key names surrounded by square brackets, such as: [showif [tvar]=yes]Yes[/showif].

WebDNA instructions are based on two types:

 Tag
 single key surrounded by square brackets, such as [ipaddress] (the I.P. Address of a Client (computing) request)
 Context
 opening tag and closing tag that surrounds what is to be parsed. ie. [Format thousands .3d]7[/Format] (parses to '007')

Parameters can be included in many of the Tags, Contexts or Commands.

Example Code (connects to a whois server and shows the information, then stores it into a permanent database)
<!--HAS_WEBDNA_TAGS-->
<html>

[text]info=[tcpconnect host=whois.domaindiscover.com&port=43]
[tcpsend]webdna.us[unurl]%0D%0A[/unurl][/tcpsend]
[/tcpconnect][/text]

[append db=base.db]domain=webdna.us&whois=[info]
[/append]

</html>

History 
According to Grant Hulbert, one of the Pacific Coast Software founders, WebCatalog (now WebDNA) began as a set of C macros to help accomplish website graphical tasks.

Before WebDNA evolved into a general-purpose server-side language, it was a special-purpose server-side language designed to help create web pages that sold stock photography. It had shopping cart features, and a searchable fixed-field database with specialized fields for storing stock photo information. After that, Pacific Coast Software quickly saw the value in creating a web programming language.

WebCatalog began its mid-1990s public debut on the Macintosh platform. As its name implies, it had an early development focus that allowed a web master or store
administrator to migrate a traditional product catalog to an online catalog.
This was most evident in 1997 and 1998, with its StoreBuilder and WebMerchant products that allowed for a user to quickly build a store front online. The term "WebCatalog" referred to the entire product, where the term "WebDNA" referred to the scripting syntax only.

Around the year 2000, WebCatalog and Pacific Coast Software were purchased by Smith Micro Software, Inc. Smith Micro Software, Inc. then changed the name of WebCatalog to WebDNA, which at that point became a name that referenced all aspects of the product. Starting with the release of WebDNA version 4.0 and ending with version 6.0a, the years 1999 to 2004 were very active years for WebDNA and the scripting language was adopted by many national and international names, including Disney, Chrysler, Kodak, Ben and Jerry's, the Pillsbury Dough Boy Shop, the NCAA Final Four and the Museum of Television and Radio. Also during this time, development of the language gained contemporary tools, such as [function] and [scope], that lend themselves to Modular programming and Structured programming.

From 2005 to 2008, for perhaps various reasons including the success of Smith Micro Software with other products, WebDNA users began to lose support from Smith Micro. WebDNA lost users against free solutions like PHP and MySQL. It was ultimately the developers of WebDNA who revived the language. In June 2008, they formed together and organized to establish WebDNA Software Corporation (WSC). WSC purchased the intellectual property that is WebDNA, and in 2009, WSC released a new WebDNA version 6.2 (Cicada).

In December 2011, a FastCGI version for the WebDNA Engine was released. This version, along with offering compatibility for non-Apache installations, changes the scope of WebDNA from a server-wide application, to a domain name-specific application. This means that a website owner can now more easily install WebDNA specifically for one domain, without affecting other domains that may reside on the server.

References

External links 
 Official website
 Download page
 Usage documentation

Scripting languages